Vitkovskijbreen is a glacier in Sørkapp Land at Spitsbergen, Svalbard. It has a length of about ten kilometers, and is located between the mountains of Hilmarfjellet and Plogen. The glacier is named after Russian scientist and General Vasilij Vasiljevich Vitkovskij.

References

Glaciers of Spitsbergen